Jane Taylor (born 7 November 1972) is a former professional tennis player from Australia.

Biography
Taylor comes from Maitland, in the Hunter Valley region of New South Wales. She made her grand slam debut as a 16-year old at the 1989 Australian Open and featured regularly in that event in the 1990s. Her best performance was a third round appearance at the 1994 Australian Open. Competing as a wildcard, she had wins over Caroline Vis and Christina Singer, before being eliminated in the third round by fifth seed Jana Novotna. She had a career best ranking of 126 in the world.

ITF finals

Singles (9–11)

Doubles (9–6)

References

External links
 
 

1972 births
Living people
Australian female tennis players
Tennis people from New South Wales
People from Maitland, New South Wales